HCM may refer to:

 Eyl Airport, in Puntland, Somalia
 Halifax Conservatory of Music, in Canada
 Harrow Central Mosque, in England
 Hausdorff Center for Mathematics, in Bonn, Germany
 Highway Capacity Manual
 Hierarchical Clustering Method (asteroids), a calculation to group asteroids into families 
 Hitachi Construction Machinery
 Ho Chi Minh, Prime Minister (1945–1955) and President (1945–1969) of North Vietnam
 Ho Chi Minh City, in Vietnam
 Human capital management, a subset of practices related to human resource management
 Hypertrophic cardiomyopathy, a disease of the myocardium (the muscle of the heart)
 Hardware cryptographic module, a type of hardware security module (HSM)